Home is an album recorded by American saxophonist Ken McIntyre in 1975 for the SteepleChase label.

Reception

Allmusic awarded the album 4½ stars calling it an "excellent outing" and stating "The post-bop music is consistently inventive and easily recommended".

Track listing
All compositions by Ken McIntyre
 "Undulation" - 3:45
 "Cousin Elma" - 3:28
 "Charlotte" - 6:42
 "Amy" - 2:58
 "Sea Train" - 3:35
 "Home" - 2:40
 "Kheil" - 3:00
 "Jamaican Sunset" - 3:57
 "Corner Time" - 6:20
 "Peas 'N' Rice" - 3:11

Personnel 
Ken McIntyre - alto saxophone, flute, bassoon, bass clarinet
Jaki Byard - piano, electric piano
Reggie Workman - bass
Andrei Strobert - drums

References 

1975 albums
Makanda Ken McIntyre albums
SteepleChase Records albums